Willer is a surname. Notable people with the surname include:

Anne Walsh Willer (1923–2017), American politician
Emil Willer (born 1932), German boxer
Jamal Willer (born 1994), Montserratian footballer
Luise Willer (1888–1970), German operatic contralto
Marina Willer, Brazilian graphic designer and filmmaker
Robb Willer (born 1977), American sociologist and social psychologist 
Shirley Willer (1922–1999), American feminist and activist

See also
Willer (given name)
Willer (disambiguation)